General elections were held in the British Virgin Islands on 20 February 1995.  The result was a victory for the incumbent Virgin Islands Party (VIP) led by Chief Minister Lavity Stoutt.  The VIP won a plurality of six seats, and thus were able to form a minority government as no other party or coalition could muster a larger number of seats.  The BVI United Party (UP) won three seats, and the Concerned Citizens Movement (CCM) won two seats.  The two other seats were won by independents.  Shortly after the election Alvin Christopher joined the VIP upon being offered a Ministerial seat, giving the VIP an outright majority.

It was the first election to be fought in the British Virgin Islands after the introduction of Territorial at-large seats.  Lavity Stoutt had fought hard against the introduction of at-large seats, fearing it would undermine the strong territorial base of the VIP.  After his victory he said: "The at-large system was a plot, a plot designed to derail H. Lavity Stoutt. Well it failed. The people have had their say. Their voice has been heard."

The 1995 general election also witnessed the first ever female representatives elected: Ethlyn E. Smith in the Fifth District, and Eileene Parsons as an At-large representative.  Eileene Parsons would later join the ruling Virgin Islands Party and become the first ever female Minister for Government in the Territory.

Former Chief Minister, Willard Wheatley ran as an independent in at the at-large seats and was resoundingly rejected by the voters, only winning slightly more votes than were recorded as spoiled ballots (265 against 232).

It was the last election in the British Virgin Islands to be fought prior to the death of Lavity Stoutt.

The supervisor of elections was Eugenie Todman-Smith.  The turnout was 68.8%.

Results

Notable candidates
Notable candidates who were elected to the Legislature for the first time included the first two women elected to the Legislature, Ethlyn Eugenie Smith and Eileene Parsons; and future Minister, Alvin Christopher.  Conversely, Willard Wheatley suffered the worst electoral defeat of his career, and would never run again.  Cyril Romney was defeated for the first time since 1975, although he would run again (unsuccessfully) in 1999.  Longtime legislators Oliver Cills and Terrance Lettsome were both elected, but neither would stand again after the 1995 election.  Lavity Stoutt was also elected, but would die later in the same year.  Andre Penn was elected for his only ever term of office; Penn would later be convicted of sexual crimes involving children and sentenced to 12 years in prison; and is believed to be the only elected official in the British Virgin Islands to be subsequently convicted of an indictable offence.

Individual territorial seats
First Electoral District

Total number of registered voters: 1,139
Total number of votes cast: 716
Percentage of voters who voted: 62.9%
Spoiled ballots: 0

Second Electoral District

Total number of registered voters: 545
Total number of votes cast: 345
Percentage of voters who voted: 83.3%
Spoiled ballots: 1

Third Electoral District

Total number of registered voters: 705
Total number of votes cast: 598
Percentage of voters who voted: 84.8%
Spoiled ballots: 1

Fourth Electoral District

Total number of registered voters: 912
Total number of votes cast: 618
Percentage of voters who voted: 67.8%
Spoiled ballots: 3

Fifth Electoral District

Total number of registered voters: 973
Total number of votes cast: 594
Percentage of voters who voted: 61.0%
Spoiled ballots: 0

Sixth Electoral District

Total number of registered voters: 955
Total number of votes cast: 643
Percentage of voters who voted: 67.3%
Spoiled ballots: 0

Seventh Electoral District

Total number of registered voters: 589
Total number of votes cast: 379
Percentage of voters who voted: 64.3%
Spoiled ballots: 1

Eighth Electoral District

Total number of registered voters: 727
Total number of votes cast: 515
Percentage of voters who voted: 70.8%
Spoiled ballots: 4

Ninth Electoral District

Total number of registered voters: 992
Total number of votes cast: 808
Percentage of voters who voted: 81.5%
Spoiled ballots: 5

At-large seats

Territorial At-Large Electoral District

Total votes rejected: 232
Total valid votes: 19,287
Total votes counted: 19,500
Percentage of votes: 63.0%
Total ballots: 5,287
Total registered: 7,731
Percentage turnout: 68.39%

References

Elections in the British Virgin Islands
British Virgin Islands
General election
British Virgin Islands
February 1995 events in North America